thumb|Giuseppe Gariboldi portrayed by F. Garuti
Giuseppe (Francesco Gabriele Patrizio Gaspare) Gariboldi (17 March 1833, Macerata – 12 April 1905, Castelraimondo) was an Italian flautist and composer.

In 1856, after studies with Giuseppe D'Aloe, he moved to Paris, where he worked as a composer and flute virtuoso. From 1859 to 1861, he concerted in Belgium, Netherlands, England and Austria. During the Franco-Prussian War, in 1870, he worked in the Red Cross. From 1871 to 1895, he taught flute and composition at the college Rollen (now Lycée Jacques-Decour) in Paris. In 1905, he returned with his family in Italy.

His works include numerous flute pieces (both solo and with piano accompaniment). A few of his studies and études are still used in teaching, namely Etudes mignonnes op. 131, 20 Petites Etudes op. 132, Exercices journaliers op. 89 and 15 Etudes modernes et progressives. Gariboldi also composed many songs and three operettas.

References

Further reading

External links
 Fabio Montesi: Een beroemd musicus uit Castelraimondo: Giuseppe Gariboldi Biography 
 Short biography 
 
 Sheet music including Gariboldi's études 

1833 births
1905 deaths
Italian classical composers
Italian male classical composers
Italian classical flautists
People from Macerata
Italian Romantic composers
19th-century Italian musicians
20th-century Italian male musicians
19th-century Italian male musicians
20th-century flautists